"Wait Forever" is a song by Robin Gibb, from the album Magnet. It was released as a single in 2003 only in Germany but did not chart.  It was edited to 3:37 for its single version.  The Shanghai Surprise mix version with a length of 6:52 was also released in 2003, and was produced by Craig Jones and Porl Young.

Track listing
"Wait Forever" – 3:31
"Wait Forever" (Shanghai Surprise Remix) – 6:52

Personnel
 Robin Gibb – lead vocals
 Grant Mitchell – keyboards, synthesizer, programming, backing vocals, producer
 Kevin Brown – guitar
 Paul Holmes – backing vocals
 Errol Reid – backing vocals

References

External links

2003 singles
2002 songs
Robin Gibb songs